Port Chicago was a town on the southern banks of Suisun Bay, in Contra Costa County, California. It is best known as the site of a devastating explosion at its Naval Munitions Depot during World War II.

History

The area was first settled by Anglo-Americans between 1850 and 1851, including Josiah Knight and Samuel E. Strode. The first permanent settler was Daniel Cunningham.

Port Chicago was originally called Bay Point. The town was created when the Bay Point Land Company, with offices in San Francisco, filed an official plat map at the Contra Costa County Recorder’s Office. The Southern Pacific Railroad ran through the town.

In 1931, as the Great Depression worsened, Walter Van Winkle, a business leader, proposed and succeeded in getting the name of the town changed from Bay Point to Port Chicago (after the Illinois city). The Bay Point post office operated from 1897 to 1931, when it became the Port Chicago post office, closing in 1969 when the town ceased to exist.

The July 17, 1944, Port Chicago disaster was a deadly munitions explosion that occurred at the Port Chicago Naval Magazine. Munitions detonated while being loaded onto a cargo vessel bound for the Pacific Theater of Operations, killing 320 sailors and civilians  and injuring 390 others. Most of the dead and injured were enlisted African-American sailors. The town of Port Chicago was heavily damaged by falling debris, including huge chunks of hot metal and unexploded bombs, but none of those bombs exploded. Over 300 buildings were damaged and more than 100 people were hurt, but none in the town were killed.

In 1968, all property was bought and buildings demolished by the federal government to form a safety zone around the adjacent Concord Naval Weapons Station loading docks.

The Port Chicago Highway, a route from the city of Concord through the site of the former town, still exists in Contra Costa County. The portion that passed through the Concord Naval Weapons Station was blocked during the 1990s as a safety and security measure. Today, Port Chicago Highway is interrupted just past the town of Clyde and continues on the other side of the U.S. Army's Military Ocean Terminal, Concord (formerly the Tidal Area of the Concord Naval Weapons Station) in the unincorporated community of Bay Point.

References

Former settlements in Contra Costa County, California
Former populated places in California
Military in the San Francisco Bay Area
Military history of California
Populated places disestablished in 1969
1969 disestablishments in California